, also known as Plundering the Source of Capital and Gambling Den Heist, is a 1975 Japanese yakuza film directed by Kinji Fukasaku.

Plot

The film begins with a bank robbery using handguns and a handmade bomb. The bomb rolls off a counter and explodes during the harried robbery. A caption explains that under Penal Code 236 a person will be sentenced to a minimum of five years in prison for robbery with the threat of violence.

The film cuts to members of the Haneda family informally gambling in a residence. Despite protests from Takeshi's wife Shizuko, Kuniyoshi convinces Takeshi and another member of the clan to join him in murdering the boss of the rival Shonankai family and then to turn themselves in, promising that this act will bring them respect and that they will be promoted to the head of the Haneda family when they are released from prison. When they leap out to surprise the opposing entourage, Takeshi's gun is knocked from his hand and the clip falls out. He fumbles to put it back together as the opposing group fires back on his crew and fixes it in time to catch the boss and shoot him down at the back of his car. A caption explains that under Penal Code 199 murderers can receive the death penalty, life in prison, or a minimum sentence of three years.

Takeshi is released after spending eight years in prison, where he is met by Kuniyoshi and Shizuko. They take Takeshi to the Makuradate Hot Springs, where Kuniyoshi tells him that their family's boss will be swearing an oath of brotherhood with the new boss of the Shonankai family and Takeshi should not return to Osaka because it will complicate things. This makes it impossible to promote Takeshi for the murder and his jail time because he killed the boss of what will now be an affiliated family. Takeshi says that he will not seek advancement in the family and will instead live a clean life because it is better for the family.

After Kuniyoshi leaves, Shizuko complains about the family's failure to live up to its promises and reward Takeshi for his actions. Takeshi quickly initiates sex amid Shizuko's warnings to wait. Her wedding ring scratches Takeshi and causes him to bleed. He takes the ring with him and leaves, saying that he has some business to handle and will return in ten days. He tells her to remain at home and to pretend that he is still there with her if the family calls from Osaka.

Takeshi secretly travels to Osaka and is picked up from the airport by Tetsu, who has brought the preparations and quickly calls in the "Old Man" from Amagasaki. These three friends from prison hole up in an unassuming shack, where Takeshi promises that their next heist will bring them a share of ten million yen each. He explains that he does not want to return to jail so they will not be robbing a bank but rather a location where no police will be called, though he refuses to disclose the target without first getting their agreement to participate. Tetsu is immediately excited but the Old Man is concerned about his wife and children and only reluctantly agrees.
Takeshi travels to the Ogoto Hot Springs and spies on the meeting between the newly befriended families on the waterfront, identifying an unattended speedboat. Meanwhile, the Old Man arrives at their hideout with the diving gear that Takeshi requested and bumps the table where Tetsu is preparing a mixture for tear gas that Takeshi requested, causing it to explode and fill the house.

That night the three load the tanks of gas onto the speedboat and ride it to an inn, where Takeshi explains that the two families are now partying following the brotherhood oath ceremony, surely wagering tens of millions of yen on their games. They land the boat and beat down three yakuza wandering near the shore, taking their guns from them and planting bombs on the yakuza's boat. Disguised in diving gear they then rush into the room where the yakuza are gambling and blast it with tear gas, holding the boss of the Shonankai family at gunpoint while they collect as much money as they can in waterproof bags and run back to their speedboat. The pursuing yakuza jump into their boat, which explodes from the bombs planted there earlier. The yakuza instead pursue them by car, but have difficulty driving on the watery shoreline. The three robbers rig their speedboat to continue on its own toward the shore on the other side as they dive into the water with their diving gear and drag the waterproof bags away as the yakuza pursue the empty boat.

Back in their hideaway shack they count up the money and find that they have stolen more than 350 million yen. Takeshi gives the other two their share and packs away the rest of the money in a single briefcase. Tetsu and the Old Man look on jealously and ask for 50 million yen more each but Takeshi fights them off, saying that none of the money should be spent in order to avoid drawing attention. He leaves to hide the money but the other two suspect that he is attempting to abandon them and run off with the money.

At a meeting between the heads of the families, Mr. Haneda explains that he had paid the police to stay away but did not suspect that they would be robbed. He apologizes to the head of the Shonankai family, whose eyes were injured during the fight, and agrees to compensate him for his loss. The head of the Shonankai family does not blame Haneda, stating that it was a random street mugging, but Haneda is passed a list of their losses from that night. After they depart, the Haneda family is angry to discover that the Shonankai family has inflated its losses.

Unable to go to the police, they instead call Bunmei Noshiro, a known crooked cop who has a young fifth wife and needs money. Noshiro discovers the remnants of the handmade explosives, including scraps of paper with Tetsu's handwriting on them. He negotiates for a reward of one million yen per robber, promising to know who they are in three days. Noshiro notices some gambling in a local restaurant and threatens to arrest the bookmakers if they don't tell him about any suspicious betting activity lately. They tell him that Tetsu, who was in jail for three years for robbing a bank, has wagered three million yen recently and they point him out to Noshiro. Noshiro follows Tetsu to a dance club full of underage hostesses and spots his own young lover Yoko making out with the manager of her old bar, leading to a fistfight. Back at home, the bruised Noshiro argues with Yoko that she is not a kid anymore and that she should stay home, promising to buy her what she wants most with his detective bonus. She demands a three-bedroom condo with a south-facing terrace that costs 35 million yen.

Takeshi tells Shizuko that he has pawned her ring, then they meet Kuniyoshi at the bar Shizuko runs and Takeshi tells him that he is moving with Shizuko back to Kyushu, where she is from. Kuniyoshi sends Takeshi out drinking with his men and waits for Shizuko on her bed when she arrives home, angrily attacking her for not leaving Takeshi for him as she had promised. When Takeshi returns home and finds them, Kuniyoshi insists that Shizuko is now his since he paid for the apartment and bar and that Takeshi should go to Kyushu alone. Takeshi says that he knew about the affair and tells Kuniyoshi to leave. Shizuko apologizes but Takeshi understands why she did it.
Noshiro spots Tetsu with a young hostess and follows them to his apartment, where he accuses Tetsu of the robbery and matches Tetsu's handwriting with the sample he collected from the robbery. He brings Tetsu to Mr. Haneda as Haneda is bidding Takeshi farewell from the city and advising him to go straight. Tetsu recognizes Takeshi but Takeshi explains that it was because they were in prison together. Noshiro then recognizes Takeshi as the murderer of the old head of the Shonankai family as he collects his million-yen bounty for Tetsu.

The Haneda family tortures Tetsu and attempts to get the names of his family as Takeshi puts on a mask and prepares to kill him to protect the secret, but he is interrupted when another masked man arrives and shoots his way through the Haneda family and rescues Tetsu. Takeshi is caught by Sugi, a member of the Haneda family, but Takeshi promises to show him where the money is, taking him to the shore and showing him the briefcase full of money in his trunk before punching him and escaping onto a boat. Sugi pursues Takeshi, who punches him into the water and shoots him, drawing the attention of others and forcing him to run.

The man who rescued Tetsu reveals himself as Bunmei and asks about the actual amount of money stolen but Tetsu escapes, leading him to the Old Man's place. Tetsu convinces the Old Man to work with him against Takeshi, then calls Tetsu and tells him to bring them each 50 million to Cafe Montpamasse in front of Amagasaki by noon the next day or he will call the Hanedas. Bunmei follows them to the meeting spot and calls Mr. Haneda and demands 100 million yen for all three robbers. Bunmei notices Takeshi when he arrives, so Takeshi does not meet the other robbers at the cafe but rather kidnaps a girl and hides in her apartment. Bunmei sees Tetsu pick the lock on Takeshi's trunk and remove the briefcase. Bunmei demands the money but Tetsu and the Old Man run. The Old Man is hit by a car and drops the briefcase, which opens to reveal merely scraps of newspaper. Bunmei finds Takeshi bribing the kidnapped girl with jewelry and Takeshi offers to match Mr. Haneda's offer to Bunmei but Bunmei refuses because he fears Haneda more. Takeshi says that he won't share any of the money and drives away.

Takeshi returns home to find Shizuko held captive by Kuniyoshi and another Haneda family member, who say that Sugi survived and told them that Takeshi was the lead robber. Shizuko begs for forgiveness and help from both Takeshi and Kuniyoshi in turn. Kuniyoshi threatens to shoot Takeshi, who throws out a locker key as a distraction and tackles the other Haneda family member just as Tetsu arrives and tackles Kuniyoshi, enabling Takeshi to force them all out. Takeshi tells Shizuko that they are splitting up but that he understands why she betrayed him, explaining that he will get a fake passport and take the money abroad. He says that he was lying about them reconciling and moving to Kyushu in order to fool the Haneda family. His final words to her include the lesson he learned in prison that "we're all alone. The only one you can trust is yourself."

Takeshi drives Tetsu back to the shack as thanks for killing the Old Man for him but Tetsu is still distrusting and demands the money, saying he will kill Takeshi if he is betrayed again. Takeshi retrieves the briefcase from the locker but is caught by Bunmei, who knocks him out and takes the money. Bunmei returns the money but when he asks for his reward he is betrayed by the Hanedas, who knowingly falsely accuse him of stealing since the amount returned does not match the exaggerated amount claimed by the Shonankai family. Bunmei pulls a gun on them but they notify him that he was fired from the police force that day and no longer has protection if he murders them. Bunmei, frustrated that all of his efforts were for nothing, returns home to find Yoko laughing with Takeshi. Takeshi asks Bunmei to join him in taking vengeance on the Hanedas and Bunmei makes him promise not to betray him this time.

The police take interest after the murder of Kuniyoshi and Shizuko tells them what she knows. The Hanedas attempt to quickly bag the money and move it as Takeshi arrives to bargain. Takeshi opens the blinds and begins the bag the money himself and when the Haneda enforcers attempt to stop him they are shot through the window by Bunmei. Takeshi forces Mr. Haneda onto the balcony and knocks him out, then he and Bunmei take the money back to the shack, where Takeshi betrays him and pulls a gun. Tetsu runs out of the shack throwing Molotov cocktails and attempts to steal the car full of money but is shot in the process and wrecks the car, dying on top of the bags of money. A saddened Bunmei pulls the bags of money from the wrecked car as Takeshi drives into him, knocking him to the ground. Bunmei, bleeding on the ground, asks Takeshi to tell Yoko that he has gone on a long journey. After Takeshi collects the money and drives away, Bunmei stands up and reveals that he was merely pretending to die because he was already lying on top of all of the money that he needed for the condo.

At the airport Takeshi is recognized by the young woman he kidnapped and fears that she will betray him to airport security, but she smiles and touches the pearl brooch he gave her. Takeshi, feeling relieved, throws his gun in the garbage and boards the plane. The film ends with a list of the statutes of limitations for various punishments.

Cast

Kin'ya Kitaōji as Takeshi Kiyomoto
Tatsuo Umemiya as Bunmei Noshiro
Kiwako Taichi as Shizuko
Yayoi Watanabe as Yoko
Hiroki Matsukata
Takuzo Kawatani as Tetsuya Bessho
Toru Abe as Hada
Hideo Murota as Kumakichi
Hiroshi Nawa as Kuniyoshi
Kenji Imai as Sugitani
Yoko Koizumi
Bin Amatsu as Sagawa
Shingo Yamashiro
Shotaro Hayashi as Haruo
Eizo Kitamura as Minagawa
Masataka Iwao as Tsukasa
Meika Seri as Michiru
Yasuhiro Suzuki as Amano
Tetsuo Fujisawa
Seizo Fukumoto
Kuniomi Kitani
Mineko Maruhira as Yukiko
Kinji Nakamura
Kyoko Nami
Ryo Nishida
Seisaku Oda
Harumi Sone

References

External links
 

1975 films
1975 crime films
1970s heist films
Films directed by Kinji Fukasaku
Yakuza films
Japanese heist films
Japanese crime films
1970s Japanese-language films
Films set in Osaka
Films about bank robbery
Toei Company films
1970s Japanese films